"Nobody but You" is a song written by J. D. Martin and John Jarrard, and recorded by American country music artist Don Williams.  It was released in July 1983 as the second single from his album Yellow Moon.  The song reached No. 2 on the Billboard Hot Country Singles chart and No. 1 on the RPM Country Tracks chart in Canada.

Chart performance

References

1983 singles
1983 songs
Don Williams songs
Song recordings produced by Garth Fundis
MCA Nashville Records singles
Songs written by John Jarrard
Songs written by J. D. Martin (songwriter)